Caroline Charlotte Townshend (1878–1944) was a British stained glass artist of the Arts and Crafts Movement. She trained at Slade School of Fine Art and Central School of Arts and Crafts before becoming a pupil of Christopher Whall. She designed and made many stained glass windows, particularly for churches and cathedrals and set up the stained glass firm of Townshend and Howson in 1920 with her student and apprentice, Joan Howson. They used a dual signature for their completed works.

Like her mother, she was a suffragette and member of the Fabian Society.

Early life
Caroline Charlotte Townshend was born on 4 September 1878 to Chambré (or "Cambrey") Corker Townshend and Emily Gibson, at 21 Endsleigh Street the fourth of five children Her father had trained as an architect and was for a while an assistant to George Edmund Street. Her mother, Emily Gibson had been the first applicant to the College for Women, (now Girton College) at Cambridge and was a student there from 1869–1872. She met her husband through Isabella Townshend, a fellow student at the College for Women. Emily later wrote "Chambrey Townshend had little push and no business ability to back up his remarkable artistic abilities" and the family lived abroad for some time as it was cheaper. Emily later served time in Holloway Prison for suffragette activity, as did Rachel, her daughter and Caroline's sister.

Education
After her family returned from Europe Caroline Townsend was a pupil at Wycombe Abbey School. Townshend was educated at the Slade School of Fine Art. After a period as a student at the Slade she decided that she wanted to try stained glass and by 1901 asked Christopher Whall to take her on as a pupil. She assisted in his studio and attended his classes at the Central School of Arts and Crafts until 1903.

Career
She set up her own studio at The Glass House in Fulham, South-West London in 1903. Many stained glass artists of the Arts and Crafts movement had their studios at The Glass House, including Mary Lowndes, Karl Parsons, Margaret Agnes Rope, M. E. Aldrich Rope, Theodora Salusbury, Arild Rosenkrantz, Wilhelmina Geddes, Clare Dawson, Rachel de Montmorency, Margaret Thompson, Lilian Josephine Pocock, Hugh Arnold and Edward Liddall Armitage.

It was at The Glass House in 1913 that she met Joan Howson, a student of the Liverpool School of Art, who would become her student and apprentice. In 1920 they set up their company Townshend & Howson.    They moved to 61 Deodar Road in Putney which they had converted to house a studio and workshop, which was also shared by fellow stained glass artist M. E. Aldrich Rope. Neighbours included Edward Woore and other stained glass artists. During the earlier part of World War II, she cared for evacuee children at three hospitals in North Wales with Howson and Rope.

Fabianism
She was member of the Fabian Society, a democratic socialist organisation, and in 1910 was a candidate of the Labour Party for the Board of Guardians in Fulham, London. In 1918, Townshend designed banners for the Fabian Society, executed by 19 women, and for the Conservative and Unionist Women's Franchise Association.

Death 
Caroline Townshend died on 10 June 1944 in Pwllheli, North Wales, leaving just over £30,000 to Joan Howson. Howson continued to use the name of their partnership after Townshend's death.

Works

Works that Townshend completed before forming the partnership Townshend and Howson, with Joan Howson include:

St Mary Magdalene, Chulmleigh
Location: Chulmleigh, Devon
Year: 1903
Townshend's very first commission. was for a window in the north aisle of this church. It depicts Saints Cuthbert, Martin (shown in the act of sharing his cloak with a beggar outside Amiens) and Boniface. Described by Cherry and Pevsner as "three saints, charming scenes below, with subtle colours".

St Mary, Greenhithe

Location: Greenhithe, Kent
Year: 1904

This church, designed by Lewis Vulliamy dates back to 1855. Townshend completed a three-light window for the church's north aisle, an interpretation of the “Presentation in the Temple”.

St Andrew, Aysgarth

Location: Aysgarth, Yorkshire
Year: 1905

This church has a two-light window by Townshend.  In the left hand light Jesus washes the feet of his disciples, while in the other he is depicted blessing the children.

St Chad, Bensham
Location: Bensham, Gateshead
Year: 1907

The chapel of All Saints in this church has two twin-light windows by Townshend dating from 1907. or 1908.

St Bartholomew, Ducklington
Location: Ducklington, Oxfordshire
Year: 1908

There is a three-light window by Townshend at the east end of the church’s south aisle. It shows Christ with St Cecilia on one side and Dorcas on the other. in the south aisle of the church there is a second window by Townshend and Howson which dates to 1934. It is of three-lights and depicts St Hugh of Lincoln in the centre light.

Newcastle Cathedral
Location: Newcastle, Northumberland
Year: 1907

Townshend completed the large four-light window in the north choir aisle of St Nicholas' Cathedral church, described as “an outstanding window of 1907 showing Northumbrian Saints and St Nicholas” by Nikolaus Pevsner and Ian Richmond.

Exchange Buildings, Newcastle upon Tyne
Location: Newcastle upon Tyne, Northumberland
Year: circa 1910

Townshend carried out some glazing work for this building.

The "Fabian Window"
Year: 1910
The "Fabian Window", on loan to the London School of Economics (LSE) Shaw Library since 2006, was made by Townshend in 1910,  to a design by George Bernard Shaw. The window, shows Edward R. Pease, Sidney Webb and other members of the Fabian Society  "helping to build “the new world”". It is thought to have remained in Townshend's studio until after her death. In 1947 it was presented to the Webb Memorial Trust's Beatrice Webb House near Dorking, from where it was stolen in 1978. It surfaced in Phoenix, Arizona soon afterwards but then disappeared again, and in the following years the only evidence of the work was the cartoon made by Townshend. The window was bought back by the Webb Memorial Trust following its reappearance at Sotheby's in July 2005.

In an article published on the LSE website it is described as having been cited as an example of "Shavian wit":
the figures are in Tudor dress to poke fun at Pease who evidently loved everything medieval. The Fabian Society coat of arms is shown as a wolf in sheep's clothing. The first man, crouching on the left, is H.G. Wells, cocking a snook at the others. He is followed by the actor-manager Charles Charrington, Aylmer Maude (translator of Tolstoy's War and Peace), G. Stirling Taylor (reading a book, New Worlds for Old), and the dentist F. Lawson Dodd. The women, from left to right, are Maud Pember Reeves (mother of Amber Reeves, who bore Wells a daughter in 1909), Miss Hankin, the suffragist Miss Mabel Atkinson, Mrs Boyd Dawson, and, at the end, the artist who made the window, Caroline Townshend herself.

It was the Fabians, Beatrice and Sidney Webb, and George Bernard Shaw who founded the London School of Economics (LSE), where the work is now housed.

St Cuthbert, Seascale
Location: Seascale, Cumbria
Year: 1910–11

Townshend completed a four-light east window depicting The Virgin and Child and "Christ in Majesty" surrounded by various Saints including James the Great, Andrew and James the Less. She also completed another window on the north side of the church.

St Nicholas, Willoughby
Location: Willoughby, Warwickshire

This church has a three-light window by Townshend. The central light contains a Salvator Mundi (“Saviour of the World”) and those on either side the lights show St Nicholas and Mary Magdalene.

St Paul's Cathedral, Rockhampton
Location: Rockhampton, Queensland
Years: 1914 and 1921

In 1914 the Bishop of Rockhampton visited England and approached various artists with a view to commissioning stained glass for the Cathedral. He chose Townshend, who designed five windows for the Cathedral's apse. The three central windows were made and installed in 1914.  They depict the Crucifixion, Christ in Majesty and Pentecost. Two other windows depicting the Nativity and the Adoration of the Lamb were installed in 1924.

St Nectan's Church, Hartland, Devon
Location: Hartland, Devon
years: 1930 and 1933

Townshend and Howsen painted windows for both St Nectan's church, Hartland and for St john's Chapel of Ease, Hartland. The windows were commissioned by Richard Pearse Chope and possibly John Lane. The subject matter is not religious but depicts the history of Hartland through the years. In order south east to north east: The Gytha window; The manorial window; the William window; the Alfred window & the Arthur window. Further work is three small roundels in the Mary Chapel window. Within St John's Chapel of Ease a window showing St Augustine & St Francis is in situ as a memorial to the wife of Mr Wilton, headmaster of the local school.

Other work
Townshend's work was included in an exhibition organised by the William Morris Gallery in 1985 to celebrate the contribution of women to the art of stained glass. Exhibits included her 1906 design for a window depicting St Crispin, the patron saint of cobblers, this window destined for the Cripples' Cobbling School which was part of the Southwark Settlement and also the 1905 design for a window commissioned by the Newcastle antiquarian William Street, of 9 Charlotte Street in North Shields. It is not known whether these windows have survived. Townshend's mother's family were from Newcastle and this connection lead to her receiving several commissions in the North East.

Gallery

Notes

References

1878 births
1944 deaths
20th-century English women artists
Alumni of the Slade School of Fine Art
Alumni of the Central School of Art and Design
Artists from London
British stained glass artists and manufacturers
Christopher Whall